Canvas Creek is a stream in Thompson-Nicola Regional District in the Interior region of British Columbia, Canada. It is in the Pacific Ocean drainage basin and is a right tributary of the North Thompson River.

The North Thompson River flows via the Thompson River and the Fraser River to the Pacific Ocean. The mouth of the stream just extends into North Thompson Oxbows Manteau Provincial Park.

The name of the creek was officially catalogued on January 29, 1962, based on the name appearing on earlier maps from 1932 and 1942. The origin of the name is unknown.

References

Rivers of British Columbia
Kamloops Division Yale Land District